Sakhalin Shipping Company (SASCO) is a Russian shipping company. Headquartered in Kholmsk, on Sakhalin Island's west coast, the company was created in 1945, and privatized in 1992.

History
On 16 October 2014, the SASCO-owned MV Simushir lost power off Haida Gwaii, also known as the Queen Charlotte Islands, along British Columbia's coast  as it made its way from Everett, Washington, US, to Russia.  The Canadian Forces' Joint Rescue Co-ordination Centre said the large oceangoing tugboat Barbara Foss arrived on 18 October to the tow of the Simushir.  The Canadian Coast Guard Cutter Gordon Reid was assisting, and the US Coast Guard kept a rescue helicopter on stand-by if the crew needed to be evacuated.  There were 10 crew members aboard the Simushir.  The USCG had already evacuated the ship's captain because of an injury he suffered.

Services
As of the fall of 2009, the company operates regular cargo boat service on the following lines:
 Vladivostok - Korsakov
 Vladivostok - Magadan
 Vladivostok - Shanghai
 Vanino - Kholmsk
 Vanino - Magadan
 Vanino - Petropavlovsk-Kamchatsky
 Korsakov - Busan
 Korsakov - Wakkanai
It also allows customers to charter vessels for tramp trade, mainly between the ports of the northwestern Pacific.

On the Vanino - Kholmsk line, the company operates four combined rail and vehicular ferries; a sailing takes no more than 18 hrs. The boats also take passengers, carrying about 60,000 a year between Sakhalin and the mainland. This service has operated since 1973.

On other lines, regular container cargo boats are mostly used.

References

External links
 Official site

Companies based in Sakhalin Oblast
Shipping companies of Russia
Shipping companies of the Soviet Union
Transport in the Russian Far East
Russian brands